The name Chad is the modernized form of the Old English given name Ceadda. It is also a short form (hypocorism) of Charles, Chadd, Chadrick and Chadwick.

Until the 20th century, Chad was very rarely used as a given name. According to the Social Security Administration, Chad first entered the top 1000 names for male children in the United States in 1945, when it was the 997th most popular name. 
Its popularity suddenly peaked beginning in the mid 1960s, reaching rank 25 in 1972 and 1973.
From the mid 1970s, its popularity began a gradual decline, reaching rank 236 in 2000 and rank 667 as of 2013.

Given name

 Chad of Mercia (died 672), Anglo-Saxon bishop
 Chad Allan (musician) (born 1943), Canadian musician and founding member of The Guess Who
 Chad Allegra (born 1980), American professional wrestler
 Chad Allen (actor) (born 1974), American actor
 Chad Allen (baseball) (born 1975), American baseball player
 Chad Ashton (born 1967), retired American soccer player
 Chad Beebe (born 1994), American football player
 Chad Bettis (born 1989), American Major League Baseball pitcher
 Chad Bond (born 1987), Welsh footballer
 Chad Bradford (born 1974), American former Major League Baseball relief pitcher
 Chad Brown (disambiguation)
 Chad Butler (1973-2007), American rapper
 Chad Channing (born 1967), former drummer for Nirvana and member of Fire Ants
 Chad Cornes (born 1979), Australian Rules Football player
 Chad Curtis (born 1968), American former Major League Baseball player convicted of sexual assault
 Chad DeGrenier (born 1973), American football player
 Chad E. Donella (born 1978), Canadian actor
 Chad Durbin (born 1977), Philadelphia Phillies relief Pitcher
 Chad Everett (1936–2012), American actor
 Chad Gould (born 1982), Filipino-English footballer
 Chad Gray (born 1971), American lead singer for Mudvayne and Hellyeah
 Chad I. Ginsburg (born 1972), lead guitarist and producer of the rock band CKY
 Chad Hansen (born 1995), American football player
 Chad Henne (born 1985), American football player
 Chad Hugo (born 1974), American record producer
 Chad Johnson (wide receiver) (born 1978), American football player
 Chad Johnson (ice hockey) (born 1986), Canadian ice hockey goaltender
 Chad S. Johnson (born 1967), American attorney and political activist
 Chad Kanoff (born 1994), American football player
 Chad Kelly (born 1994), American football player
 Chad Kelsay (born 1977), American football player
 Chad Kessler (American football) (born 1975), American football player
 Chad Kilgore (born 1989), American football player
 Chad Kroeger (born 1974), lead singer and guitarist for Nickelback
 Chad le Clos (born 1992), South African world and Olympic champion in swimming
 Chad Levitt (born 1975), American National Football League player
 Chad Lowe (born 1968), American actor and director
 Chad McKnight, American professional basketball player
 Chad McMahan, American politician
 Chad Mendes, American mixed martial arts fighter 
 Chad Michael Murray (born 1981), American actor
 Chad Michaels, American drag queen
 Chad Muma (born 1999), American football player
 Chad Muska (born 1977), American professional skateboarder
 Chad Pennington (born 1976), American football player
 Chad Peralta (born 1985), Filipino-Australian singer and actor
 Chad Person (born 1978), US contemporary artist
 Chad Randall (born 1980), Harlequins Rugby League player
 Chad M. Rienstra (Born 1971), Chemistry Professor at UW-Madison
 Chad Robinson (born 1980), Harlequins Rugby League player
 Chad Smith (disambiguation)
 Chad Sexton (born 1970), drummer for 311
 Chad Stahelski (born 1968), American stuntman and film director
 Chad Stuart (1941-2020), one half of the pop duo of Chad & Jeremy
 Chad Thomas (born 1995), American football player
 Chad Taylor (guitarist) (born 1970), American guitarist and backing vocalist in the bands The Gracious Few and Live
 Chad Taylor (writer) (born 1964), New Zealand writer
 Chad Trujillo (born 1973), astronomer
 Chad Urmston (born 1976), lead singer and guitarist for Dispatch and State Radio
 Chad VanGaalen (born 1977), Canadian musician and singer
 Chad Varah (1911–2007), founder of The Samaritans crisis hotline organization
 Chad Vaughn (born 1980), American weightlifter
 Chad Wackerman (born 1960), American drummer
 Chad Williams (wide receiver) (born 1994), American football player

Surname
 Charles Chad (born 1982), Brazilian footballer
 Dominic Chad (born 1972), English rock guitarist
 George William Chad (1781 or 1784-1849), English diplomat
 Norman Chad (born 1958), American sportswriter and syndicated columnist

Fictional characters
 Chad (Saturday Night Live), played by Pete Davidson
 Chad Danforth, from the High School Musical franchise
 Chad Dylan Cooper, from Sonny with a Chance
 The title character of Chad Vader: Day Shift Manager, an Internet Star Wars fan series
 The Blue Lightspeed Ranger "Chad Lee" from the Power Rangers franchise
 Chad C. Mulligan, from Stand on Zanzibar
 Chad Feldheimer, from Burn After Reading
 Chad Hanna, title character of Chad Hanna
 Giga Chad (slang), from the titular meme based off Russian model Ernest Khalimov
 Yasutora Sado, nicknamed Chad, from the anime and manga series Bleach

See also

Chadwick (given name)
Chads (surname)
Chal (name)
Char (name)
Chad (slang)

References

English masculine given names
Hypocorisms